The men's long jump event at the 2021 European Athletics Indoor Championships was held on 4 March at 19:08 (qualification) and 5 March at 20:20 (final) local time.

Medalists

Records

Results

Qualification
Qualification: Qualifying performance 8.00 (Q) or at least 8 best performers (q) advance to the Final.

Final

References

2021 European Athletics Indoor Championships
Long jump at the European Athletics Indoor Championships